The 42nd Primetime Emmy Awards were held on Sunday, September 16, 1990. The ceremony was broadcast on Fox from the Pasadena Civic Auditorium in Pasadena, California. Two networks, The Family Channel and The Disney Channel, received their first major nominations.

For its second season, Murphy Brown won Outstanding Comedy Series and two other major awards. Defending champion Cheers received the most major nominations for a comedy series with 11 and Newhart finished its series run with 21 major nominations, but not a single win. On the drama side, L.A. Law won Outstanding Drama Series for the third time in four years and also won three major awards, receiving the most major nominations for a drama series with 11. This became the first year that every cast member of The Golden Girls wasn't nominated for a Primetime Emmy Award.

This ceremony was remembered for the circumstance that three major categories resulted in ties, the most ever for one ceremony.

A clip of The Simpsons presenting the award for Outstanding Lead Actor in a Comedy Series can be seen on the DVD boxset of the second season as a special feature.

Winners and nominees

Programs

Acting

Lead performances

Supporting performances

Guest performances

Directing

Writing

Most major nominations
By network 
 NBC / ABC – 47
 CBS – 35
 HBO – 11

By program
 Cheers (NBC) / L.A. Law (NBC) – 11
 Murphy Brown (CBS) – 9
 thirtysomething (ABC) – 8
 Twin Peaks (ABC) – 7
 The Golden Girls (NBC) – 6

Most major awards
By network 
 ABC – 10
 CBS – 9
 NBC – 8
 HBO – 3
 Fox – 2

By program
 L.A. Law (NBC) / Murphy Brown (CBS) – 3
 Age-Old Friends (HBO) / Caroline? (CBS) / Cheers (NBC) / Columbo (ABC) / thirtysomething (ABC) / The Wonder Years (ABC) – 2

Notes

References

External links
 Emmys.com list of 1990 Nominees & Winners
 

042
1990 television awards
1990 in California
September 1990 events in the United States